Jurong West Public Library is a public library in Jurong West, Singapore. It is co-located with The Frontier Community Club at Jurong West Community Building. The nearest MRT station is Boon Lay. It is the first public library owned by the National Library Board to be located inside a mall.

History 
The library was originally called Jurong West Community Library. It was officially opened on 28 March 1996 by Mr Ho Kah Leong, who was the then Senior Parliamentary Secretary for Ministry of Environment and Member of Parliament for Jurong. The library was located at Jurong Point. It was relocated to The Frontier Community Place after being closed for 2 months. It reopened on 10 March 2006. It was renamed as Jurong West Public Library after the renovation. It currently has 3 levels and is integrated with the community centre.

Layout 
The library consists of three levels. The first level contains adult, children, and young adult materials, the second level contains further children's materials and family planning information, and the third level contains adult fiction and non-fiction.

Level 1 
 Adult's collection
 Fiction
 AV materials
 Magazines
 Young People's collection
 AV materials
 Children's collection
 AV materials

Level 2 
 Children's collection
 Non fiction
 Information books
 English
 Chinese
 Malay
 Tamil
 Fiction
 English
 Chinese
 Malay
 Tamil
 Singapore collection
 Books for babies
 Adult's collection
 Family & parenting

Level 3 
 Adult's collection
 Fiction
 English
 Chinese
 Malay
 Tamil
 Non fiction
 Business & finance
 Recreation
 IT
 Arts
 Cooking
 Recreation
 Comics

See also 
 National Library Board
 List of libraries in Singapore
 Jurong Regional Library

References

External links 
National Library Board

Libraries in Singapore
Jurong West
1996 establishments in Singapore
Libraries established in 1996